Kajang 2 is a township in Kajang township Bangi constituency, Selangor, Malaysia.

Background 
Kajang 2 is located near Jalan Reko. The area was developed by MKH Berhad. Kajang 2 is an integrated development designed to become the next central business district of Kajang. The town has infrastructure that is well-connected to the Kajang 2's own KTM commuter station, which is just one stop away from the Stadium Kajang MRT Station (MRT Kajang Line). The township offers a range of facilities including integrated transit shopping malls, educational institutions such as Chinese primary and secondary schools, private and international schools, a city campus, a medical centre, a hotel tower, a corporate office tower, shop offices, and landed and high-rise residential properties. The township spans  and has an estimated gross development value (GDV) of RM5.7 billion.

Access

The township is accessible via road from Kajang Dispersal Link Expressway (SILK) from Exit 1805A at Kajang Utama.

References 

Townships in Selangor